Kur Bolagh-e Yek (also Romanized as Kūr Bolāgh-e Yek; also known as Kūr Bolāgh-e Soflá) is a village in Baladarband Rural District, in the Central District of Kermanshah County, Kermanshah Province, Iran. At the 2006 census, its population was 112, in 25 families.

References 

Populated places in Kermanshah County